Gonzalo Segares González (born October 13, 1982) is a Costa Rican retired footballer who spent most of his career with Chicago Fire in the Major League Soccer. He currently serves as head coach for the United States U17 national team.

Playing career

Youth and college
Segares started his career playing in Saprissa's minor league system, before being awarded with a scholarship to play college soccer at Virginia Commonwealth University from 2001 to 2004. Segares was a strong player from his debut, starting all 83 games he played in his four seasons. He registered 16 goals and 10 assists from the back in his four years with the team, was a first-team All-CAA selection his final three years, and was a first team All-American and Hermann Trophy finalist as a senior. During this time he also played with the Williamsburg Legacy in the USL Premier Development League.

Professional
Segares began his professional career with the Chicago Fire as a 2005 SuperDraft third round selection, and quickly proved himself during his rookie campaign. Segares was in the Fire's starting eleven for the first three games of the 2006 campaign until an ankle injury sidelined the young defender for a month of action. Upon his return, Segares came back with a vengeance, starting 19 of Chicago's last 24 games. Segares also helped the "Men in Red" earn an MLS club-record fourth Lamar Hunt U.S. Open Cup title in 2006, playing every minute in the tournament's Final. He held down the left side of defense in Chicago's starting XI in 2008 and 2009, while balancing his burgeoning duties for both club and country.

After the 2009 season, Segares left the Fire for Greek Cypriot club Apollon Limassol on a free transfer. In August 2010 Segares returned to the Fire. On December 6, 2012 Chicago Fire re-signed Segares to a multi-year deal.  At the end of the 2014 season, the club declined his contract option.

On February 4, 2015, Segares announced his retirement.

International
Earning his first call up in 2007, Segares participated in 2010 FIFA World Cup qualifying and the 2009 CONCACAF Gold Cup, where Costa Rica made it to the semifinals.

Coaching career
After his retirement, Segares remained on staff with Chicago Fire as an academy coach and a club ambassador. In January 2020, he joined the United States Soccer Federation becoming United States U15 head coach. On October 18, 2021, Segares was announced as the United States U17 new head coach.

Personal
Segares holds a U.S. green card which qualified him as a domestic player for MLS roster purposes.

Honours

Chicago Fire
Lamar Hunt U.S. Open Cup
Winners (1): 2006

Individual
Chicago Fire Defender of the Year:
Winner: (1): 2007

References

External links
 
 

1982 births
Living people
Footballers from San José, Costa Rica
Association football defenders
Costa Rican footballers
Costa Rica international footballers
2009 CONCACAF Gold Cup players
Deportivo Saprissa players
VCU Rams men's soccer players
Legacy 76 players
Chicago Fire FC players
Apollon Limassol FC players
Major League Soccer players
USL League Two players
Cypriot First Division players
Costa Rican expatriate footballers
Expatriate soccer players in the United States
Expatriate footballers in Cyprus
Major League Soccer All-Stars
Chicago Fire FC draft picks
Chicago Fire FC non-playing staff
All-American men's college soccer players